Fredericktown United States Post Office is a historic post office building located at Fredericktown, Madison County, Missouri.  It was designed by the Office of the Supervising Architect under Louis A. Simon and built in 1936–1937.  It is a one-story, rectangular, WPA-Moderne style red brick and limestone building. It measures approximately 64 feet by 68 feet and features an elaborated raised entrance within an ashlar enframement of pilasters and tall, complex windows. The lobby has a Treasury Section of Fine Arts mural by Missourian James Baare Turnbull titled, "The Lead Belt," installed in 1939.

It was added to the National Register of Historic Places in 2009.

References

Fredericktown
Modernist architecture in Missouri
Government buildings completed in 1937
Buildings and structures in Madison County, Missouri
National Register of Historic Places in Madison County, Missouri